Chinese VX (CVX), also known as EA-6043, is an organophosphate nerve agent of the V-series. It is a structural isomer of both VX and Russian VX.

See also
VX (nerve agent)
VR (nerve agent)

References

V-series nerve agents
Acetylcholinesterase inhibitors
Phosphonothioates
Diethylamino compounds